Phú Nhuận is one of the nineteen urban districts in Ho Chi Minh City, Vietnam. It is densely populated, with 180,100 inhabitants in an area of just 4.88 km2. Phú Nhuận district is sometimes considered the center of Ho Chi Minh City due to its central location from all of the surrounding districts. As of 2003 the district had a population of 181,243. The district covers an area of 5 km2.

There are 13 wards in Phú Nhuận District as of March, 2021:
Ward 1,
Ward 2,
Ward 3,
Ward 4,
Ward 5,
Ward 7,
Ward 8,
Ward 9,
Ward 10,
Ward 11,
Ward 13,
Ward 15,
Ward 17. In 2021, Vietnam's Standing Committee of the National Assembly decided to merge Wards 11 and 12, and Wards 13 and 14 of Phú Nhuận. The new wards are named Ward 11 and Ward 13, respectively. A similar process was done to Wards 6 and 16 in 1982.

Phú Nhuận is an up-and-coming area that is gaining popularity for young Vietnamese professionals. This district is also famous for its secret cafes. There are a number of cafes in garden or vintage styles.

References

External links
Chua Quan The Am - Famous Pagoda
List of Restaurants and Cafes in the Phu Nhuan District
Map of the Phu Nhuan District
'Phu Nhuan Drama Center'
Pictures of the Phu Nhuan District

Districts of Ho Chi Minh City